Fudong Township is a township in Lancang Lahu Autonomous County, Yunnan, China.

Etymology
The name "Fudong" are terms of Dai language. "Fu" means edge of a field and "Dong" means flat field.

Administrative division
As of 2016, the township is divided into eight villages: 
Fudong 
Taozishu 
Dahei 
Nadong 
Nandian 
Xiaoba 
Bangwai 
Huangteng

History
It came under the jurisdiction of Wendong District before 1988. It was incorporated as a township in 1988.

Geography
It lies at the northern of Lancang Lahu Autonomous County, bordering Wendong Wa Ethnic Township to the west, Dashan Township and Shangyun Town to the south, Shuangjiang Lahu, Va, Blang and Dai Autonomous County to the north, and Dashan Township to the east.

There are three reservoirs in the township, namely the Bangwai Reservoir, Fudong Reservoir and Dahei Reservoir.

There are six rivers and streams in the township, namely the Nandian River, Fudong River, Dahei River, Xiaoba River, Nanjiao River, and Baimujing River.

Economy
The economy is supported primarily by farming, ranching and mineral resources. Commercial crops include tea, Lanxangia tsaoko, Pseudocydonia, Zanthoxylum, and tobacco.

Demographics

As of 2017, the National Bureau of Statistics of China estimates the township's population now to be 13,824.

References

Bibliography

Townships of Pu'er City
Divisions of Lancang Lahu Autonomous County